Red Cedar Technology is a software development and engineering services company. Red Cedar Technology was founded by Michigan State University professors Ron Averill and Erik Goodman in 1999. The headquarters is located in East Lansing, Michigan, near MSU's campus. Red Cedar Technology develops and distributes the HEEDS Professional suite of design optimization software. HEEDS is based on spin-out technology from Michigan State University. On June 30, 2013 Red Cedar Technology was acquired by CD-adapco. CD-adapco was acquired in 2016 by Siemens Digital Industries Software.

History
Red Cedar Technology was founded in 1999 to commercialize technology developed at Michigan State University. The company initially provided engineering consulting services including non-linear FEA and design optimization. The optimization technology was released as a software product, HEEDS, in 2004.

HEEDS MDO
HEEDS (Hierarchical Evolutionary Engineering Design System) MDO is a software package that interfaces with commercial CAE tools in order to automate and improve the search for better product and/or process designs. HEEDS can perform both single-objective and multi-objective (Pareto) optimization. Additionally, HEEDS includes the ability to perform Design of Experiments and Reliability analysis. HEEDS MDO was formerly named HEEDS Professional.

HEEDS is utilized across many industries, including Aerospace, Automotive, Biomedical, and Manufacturing. Products such as Nitinol stents, crash rails in automobiles, MEMS and fiber composite parts have all been designed using HEEDS.

HEEDS generically interfaces with analysis codes through batch execution and different forms of scripting, but also includes direct interfaces to several commonly used CAE tools, including Abaqus, ANSYS, LS-DYNA, Nastran, NX, STAR-CCM+ and Microsoft Excel.

Design Optimization

When an engineer is required to design a component or system to conflicting performance criteria, design optimization is often used. HEEDS allows the user to analyze a design based on their normal CAE tools, and explore different options that exist based on user-defined design variables. HEEDS includes the SHERPA algorithm, which is an intelligent, hybrid, adaptive design optimization method. SHERPA is based on over two decades of research at Michigan State University, and was spun off to Red Cedar Technology in 1999.

HEEDS also has the MO-SHERPA algorithm, which is an adapted version of the SHERPA algorithm designed for multi-objective design optimization. This gives the user the opportunity to find a set of Pareto optimal designs, and gain information regarding the trade offs between the objectives.

The following design optimization algorithms are available in HEEDS:
 SHERPA
 Multi-objective SHERPA (MO-SHERPA)
 Genetic algorithm
 Sequential quadratic programming
 Simulated annealing
 Response surface methodology
 Multi-start local search
 Particle swarm optimization
 Nelder-Mead Simplex

Design of Experiments (DOE)

HEEDS allows the user to predict sensitivities using Design of Experiments. The following sampling methods are available:
 Full factorial designs (2-level and 3-level)
 Fractional factorial designs (2-level and 3-level)
 Taguchi orthogonal arrays
 Plackett-Burman designs
 Latin hypercube designs
 Central composite designs
 D-optimal designs
 Taguchi robust design arrays
 User-defined arrays
 User-defined response data

Robustness and Reliability

HEEDS has a Robustness and Reliability agent which allows the user to perform robustness studies using Monte Carlo Sampling or Latin hypercube sampling and reliability studies using Monte Carlo Sampling, Latin hypercube sampling, or FORM. Robustness studies can tell the user how sensitive the design is to stochastic variation of the input parameters. Reliability studies can tell the user how likely a design is to violate constraint limits as a result of stochastic variation of the input parameters.

HEEDS NP
HEEDS NP is a non-parametric, mesh-based optimization tool that is used to design structural components. The mesh of the component is morphed directly by the software to meet mass or stress targets.

HEEDS POST

HEEDS POST is a post-processing and data visualization suite designed to work with HEEDS MDO results files.

Red Cedar University
Red Cedar University is a service provided by Red Cedar Technology to educate those interested in design optimization.

References

External links
 Red Cedar Technology Website
 Red Cedar University Website

Computer-aided engineering software
Software companies based in Michigan
Engineering consulting firms of the United States
Companies based in Ingham County, Michigan
Defunct software companies of the United States